Statistics of Swedish football Division 2 in season 1982.

League standings

Division 2 Norra 1982

Division 2 Södra 1982

Footnotes

References
Sweden - List of final tables (Clas Glenning)

Swedish Football Division 2 seasons
2
Sweden
Sweden